The 1837 Massachusetts gubernatorial election was held on November 13.

Incumbent Whig Governor Edward Everett was re-elected to a third term in office, defeating Democrat Marcus Morton.

General election

Candidates
 Edward Everett, incumbent Governor since 1836 (Whig)
 Marcus Morton, Associate Justice of the Massachusetts Supreme Judicial Court, former acting Governor and nominee since 1828 (Democratic)

Campaign
The campaign was dominated by the Panic of 1837, which was blamed on President Martin Van Buren and erased much of the gains made by the Democratic Party in the decade prior. Van Buren's call for a system of independent treasuries was unpopular in the state. 

Francis Baylies and Richard Fletcher also took active part in the Whig campaign, attacking former President Andrew Jackson and President Van Buren for causing the panic with their attacks on the national bank.

Morton declined to take any active role in the campaign. Nonetheless, the Whig Atlas assailed him as a "political" judge and called for his impeachment and removal from the bench. Democrats countered the Whig campaign by linking the Boston banking interests and Governor Everett to Masonic influence.

On November 11, Whigs held a rally at Faneuil Hall with national leaders including Daniel Webster, John Bell, William J. Graves, Joseph R. Underwood and Ogden Hoffman.

This was also among the first elections in Massachusetts to feature slavery as an issue. Late in the campaign, William Ellery Channing joined the anti-slavery cause with an epistle against the annexation of Texas, arguing that it was a theft of Mexican territory, an extension of the slave system, and risked angering Great Britain by threatening their position in the Caribbean. He appealed to Henry Clay and Governor Everett to abandon pro-business orientation toward the plantation system. Morton, by contrast, had been among the most anti-slavery members of the Democratic Party. Benjamin F. Hallett of the Advocate soon thereafter published a review of Everett's 1826 declaration in favor of the slave system and contrasted it to Morton's 1827 declaration in opposition to slavery.

Results

See also
 1837 Massachusetts legislature

References

Bibliography
 

Governor
1837
Massachusetts
November 1837 events